Juana Leticia Herrera Ale (born 8 June 1960) is a Mexican politician affiliated with the PRI. She currently serves as Senator of the LXII Legislature of the Mexican Congress representing Durango. She also served as Deputy during the LX Legislature.

References

1960 births
Living people
Politicians from Durango
People from Gómez Palacio, Durango
Women members of the Senate of the Republic (Mexico)
Members of the Senate of the Republic (Mexico)
Members of the Chamber of Deputies (Mexico)
Institutional Revolutionary Party politicians
21st-century Mexican politicians
21st-century Mexican women politicians
Women members of the Chamber of Deputies (Mexico)
Members of the Congress of Durango
Municipal presidents in Durango